This release contains three electronic remixes of "You're My Heart" by Toronto remixers/producers Pilotpriest, Mansion and CCENTURIESS. It is the second release from Canadian indie rock band Lioness (band). It was released on April 7, 2009 by New Romantic Music.

Track listing
All songs by Lioness (Fischer/Morris/Scheven).
"You're My Heart (Pilotpriest remix)" - 7:20
"You're My Heart (CCENTURIESS remix)"  - 6:19
"You're My Heart (Mansion remix)" - 5:50
"You're My Heart (original version)" - 4:30

Personnel
Vanessa Fischer – vocals
Ronnie Morris – bass
Jeff Scheven – drums, electronica,

2009 EPs
Lioness (band) albums
2009 remix albums
Remix EPs